Edward Standish Bradford (December 1, 1842 - September 1, 1914) was an American wool manufacture and politician who served as a member of the Webster, Massachusetts Board of Selectmen, on the Common Council of the city of Springfield, Massachusetts, in both branches of the Massachusetts legislature, as the 21st Mayor of Springfield, Massachusetts and as the 35th Treasurer and Receiver-General of Massachusetts.

Family life
Bradford married Mary (Slater) Standish, they had several children including a son Edward Standish Bradford, Jr.

References

Bibliography
 City of Springfield, Municipal Register of the City of Springfield, Springfield, Massachusetts: City of Springfield, Massachusetts, pp 770–772, (1915).
 Eliot, Samuel Atkins, Editor Biographical History of Massachusetts: Biographies and Autobiographies of the Leading Men in the State, Volume 5,, non-pagenated, Boston, Massachusetts: Massachusetts Biographical Society (1914).
 "The Minute Man, Official Bulletin of the National Society of the Sons of the American Revolution Magazine, Volume XX, No. 2., New Members, page. 241, Washington, D.C. : National Society of the Sons of the American Revolution, (October 1925).

1842 births
Springfield, Massachusetts City Council members
Members of the Massachusetts House of Representatives
Massachusetts state senators
Mayors of Springfield, Massachusetts
State treasurers of Massachusetts
1914 deaths
Politicians from Pawtucket, Rhode Island